The second season of Project Runway Philippines premiered on August 12, 2009, on cable network ETC and UHF station Southern Broadcasting Network.  Model and actress Teresa Herrera returns as the program's host, while fashion designers Jojie Lloren and Rajo Laurel renew their mentorship and judging duties respectively, with top model and fashion columnist Apples Aberin completing the judging panel.

Thirteen (13) designers from all over the Philippines compete in weekly fashion design challenges to earn a spot in Philippine Fashion Week. The winner of this season will receive P500,000 (around US$10,400), an editorial spread in Preview magazine, a start-up business package, and a summer scholarship from Istituto Marangoni, which is the European partner of School of Fashion and the Arts.

Auditions
The second season auditions were held during the time period between December 2008 and March 2009.  Auditions for designers based in Metro Manila and Luzon Island were conducted in SM City North EDSA and SM Megamall, while casting call for designers in Visayas and Mindanao island groups were done in SM City Cebu and SM City Davao respectively.  A final round of auditions was also held at Solar Century Tower in Makati.

Contestants
The 13 designers competing in the second season of Project Runway Philippines consists of established designers and new designers who used to have jobs unrelated to fashion such as a nurse, a call center agent, and an accountant.  They were introduced at a launch party held at Embassy Superclub in Taguig City.  Note that the ages listed are the designers' ages at the time the show was taped in early 2009.

 Manny Marquez, 37 years old from San Pedro, Laguna.  A former scholar of top fashion designer Ben Ferrales, who left his pregnant wife to join the competition.
 Russell Villafuerte, 25 years old from San Jose, Antique.  An Interior Design graduate from University of the Philippines who works as a graphic designer. Eliminated - December 2, 2009
 Santi Obcena, 25 years old from Quezon City, Metro Manila.  A former dancer who studied at the Philippine High School for the Arts.  Participated in Philippine Fashion Week 2009.Eliminated - December 2, 2009
 Cherry Veric, 27 years old from Ibajay, Aklan.  A formal wear designer who used to work in Saudi Arabia and China.Eliminated - October 28, 2009
 Patrick Galang, 25 years old from San Pedro, Laguna.  A former call center agent.  Participated in Philippine Fashion Week in 2008.  He was cited by Mega magazine as one of "8 Designers You Should Know" and by Preview magazine as one of "11 Best New Designers."  Eliminated - September 9, 2009, and again on October 21, 2009
 Hanz Coquilla, 27 years old from Talisay City, Cebu.  Dropped out of school, with a major in medical technology, to pursue a career as a fashion designer, which he has been doing for nine years. Eliminated - October 14, 2009
 Meanne Santos, 21 years old from Bacoor, Cavite.  This season's youngest designer, she landed a design job right after graduating from college.  She won a student design competition at De La Salle-College of Saint Benilde in 2007. Eliminated - October 7, 2009
 Richie Bondoc, 29 years old from Mexico, Pampanga.  A graduate of Angeles University Foundation, he is a dressmaker's son who inherited his mother's business after she died of cancer. Eliminated - October 7, 2009
 Randy Leaño, 32 years old from Laoag City, Ilocos Norte.  A Physical Education teacher from Mariano Marcos State University who began making clothes for his students' school plays. Eliminated - September 16, 2009
 Jas Cristobal, 35 years old from Valenzuela City, Metro Manila.  A former accountant who designs and sews her own work wardrobe, then eventually creates clothes for her colleagues.  Eventually crossed-over into creating hand-painted handbags and shoes. Eliminated - September 2, 2009
 Tracy Dizon, 26 years old from Quezon City, Metro Manila.  A single mother and fashion stylist for television and merchandising.  She was head stylist and costume designer for ABS-CBN's Lastikman.  She is also one of three designers, along with season one second runner-up Veejay Floresca, who will represent the Philippines in the 47th Japan Fashion Design Competition. Eliminated - August 26, 2009
 Pau Geronimo, 23 years old from Pasay.  A multi-genre designer who majored in Clothing Technology at University of the Philippines.  Eliminated - August 19, 2009
 Hazel Sta. Ana, 23 years old from Pasig.  A registered nurse who decided to pursue fashion design.  Eliminated - August 12, 2009

Episode summaries

Episode 1 - Self-Deconstruction
Original Airdate: August 12, 2009

After settling in their rooms in Makati's Amorsolo Mansions, the designers were invited by Teresa and Jojie for a welcome toast located at one of the city's rooftop swimming pools. Prior to arriving at the party venue, the designers were asked to bring a bag of extra clothes. Their first challenge was then revealed to the designers upon arrival: to create a dress by deconstructing the clothes off their backs, as well as choosing another roll of colored fabric located at the other end of the pool as added material. The designers were given exactly five minutes to take off their clothes and race to the end of the pool to pull their selected fabric swatches. Their creation should illustrate their design philosophy. The winner of the challenge was given immunity for the next round.

Guest Judge:  Vic Barba, noted fashion designer
Winner:  Patrick Galang
Eliminated: Hazel Sta. Ana

Episode 2 - Movie Challenge
Original Airdate: August 19, 2009

The 12 designers were divided into four teams of three members each.  After asking each designer of their favorite movie, Jojie randomly selected Hanz, Santi, Jas, and Cherry as team leaders, who then chose their respective teammates.  Each team would then create a three-piece collection inspired by a movie that they have chosen.  The teams were given a budget of P6,000 (about US$124) each and were brought to Carolina's Lace Shoppe in Glorietta 1, Makati, to purchase their materials.  The winner of this challenge would be granted immunity for the next challenge.

Guest Judge:  James Reyes, noted fashion designer
Winner:  Jas Cristobal
Eliminated: Pau Geronimo

Episode 3 - Bridal Wear Challenge
Original Airdate: August 26, 2009

The designers were visited by Filipina top model Isabel Roces, who told them about their next challenge:  To create a wedding dress for her upcoming destination wedding.  The only catch is that they are not allowed to use white.

Guest Judges:  Isabel Roces, Filipina top model and vice president of Professional Models Association of the Philippines; Patrice Ramos-Diaz, noted bridal designer
Winner:  Hanz Coquilla
Eliminated: Tracy Dizon

Episode 4 - Designer Makeover
Original Airdate: September 2, 2009

Each of the ten designers was tasked to create a makeover design to their client:  a fellow designer.  They were given P2,000 (about US$41) and one day to complete the new look.

Guest Judge:  Tim Yap, party promoter and "style guru"
Winner:  Randy Leaño
Eliminated: Jas Cristobal

Episode 5 - Resort Loungewear Challenge
Original Airdate: September 9, 2009

The designers were introduced to fashion designer Hindy Weber-Tantoco who introduced them to their newest challenge:  Create a luxurious resort wear out of what she described as "the crummiest of materials."  The designers then proceeded to the work room where they discovered nine sacks containing the following materials:  Banig (a woven mat made of palm leaves), white t-shirts, flannel, rags made of scrap fabric, muslin, and terrycloth towels.  They were also given P1,000 (around US$20) to buy additional materials and one day to complete the design.

This episode also features a side challenge.  Apples Aberin visited the work room and informed them that she will be featured at a feature spread for Pond's on Preview magazine.  She asked them to sketch a design for the dress she would be wearing in the spread.  Aberin then chose two designers based on the sketches who will also serve as team leaders, who in turn chose their team members.  They were given seven days in a seven-week period to complete their respective dresses.  The final creations for this side challenge will be revealed in a future episode, with the winning group to appear in the feature spread along with Aberin.

Guest Judge:  Hindy Weber-Tantoco, fashion designer for Culte Femme and curator for Rustan's Commercial Corporation
Winner:  Cherry Veric
Eliminated: Patrick Galang

Episode 6 - Futuristic Couture
Original Airdate: September 16, 2009

Lloren introduced the designers to Pauline Suaco-Juan, editor-in-chief of Preview magazine, who told them about their next challenge:  Making a dress with a futuristic design based on the magazine's trend forecast using natural fabrics.  They were given P5,000 and one day to finish their creations.

An update on the Pond's Challenge was also shown.  The two teams were given two yards of red silk chiffon fabric and were given several minutes to discuss about their designs.  With Galang eliminated in the previous episode, Veric voluntarily took over the leadership role on his team, using his own sketch as the basis for their design.

Guest Judges:  Pauline Suaco-Juan, editor-in-chief of Preview magazine; Melissa Dizon, designer of Eairth
Winner:  Hanz Coquilla
Eliminated: Randy Leaño

Episode 7 - Avant Garde and Architectural
Original Airdate: September 23, 2009

The designers were brought on a field trip to a modernly-designed house located in Calatagan, Batangas.  Herrera greeted them by the doorway and paired the designers in teams of two members, starting with the top three designers from the previous episode picking their respective partners leaving Villafuerte the odd man out.  The host then introduced him to his partner:  Patrick Galang, who was eliminated in Episode 5.  Herrera informed the designers of their challenge:  To create an avant-garde dress inspired from the house.  The designers then met Carlos Calma, the architect behind the abode, who took them on a tour inside the establishment.  The house was highlighted by the use of glass panels instead of walls, rhythmic structures, and Cobonpue furniture.  The designers then proceeded to Metro Gaisano department store in Market! Market! to purchase materials for their creations using a P5,000 budget.

Guest Judges:  Jojie Lloren, mentor of Project Runway Philippines, who incidentally is an avant-garde designer and grand prize winner of Concours International des Jeunes Créateurs de Mode (an international student fashion design competition held in Paris) in 1998
Winner:  Hanz Coquilla and Manny Marquez
Eliminated: none1

Note 1:  The judges decided not to eliminate because they believed the designers presented impressive creations for this challenge.

Episode 8 - Taming Tessa
Original Airdate: October 7, 2009

The designers were introduced to Tessa Prieto-Valdes, a Philippine fashion icon known for her over-the-top, eccentric, and colorful style. The designers were tasked to tone down or tame Tessa Prieto-Valdes's outrageous style by creating a ready-to-wear (RTW) ensemble with a budget of only P800. While the brief was to tone down the exaggerated point of view of how Tessa dresses, the designers were also tasked that their creations still echo a touch of Tessa's quirky personality and also that their garments look expensive despite their limited budget. They were also taken to the showroom of Michelis where they selected accessories for their designs. Mentor Jojie Lloren instructed them to use all the accessories they chose. This episode features a double elimination since the previous episode retained all the designers.

Guest Judges:  Tessa Prieto-Valdes
Winner:  Russell Villafuerte
Eliminated: Richie Bondoc, Meanne Santos

Episode 9 – Rockstar Menswear
Original Airdate: October 14, 2009

Teresa met with the designers on the runway and hinted that fashion and music go "hand in hand". She then asked the contestants to randomly select music CDs from a bag. Having selected their respective discs, Teresa then revealed the rest of the details of the challenge: they are to be paired with members of top rock bands in the Philippines based on the albums they picked, and were tasked to design a rock star ensemble for them.

Guest Judges:  Joey Samson, Bryanboy
Winner:  Manny Marquez
Eliminated: Hanz Coquilla

Episode 10 – The L'Oréal Anniversary Challenge
Original Airdate: October 21, 2009

The remaining designers were given party invites from host Teresa Herrera, only to be told they would only be opened when they will be in the SoFA workroom with mentor Jojie Lloren. Upon arrival, Jojie introduced to the designers one of the chief makeup artists for L'Oreal Paris, Jigs Mayuga, who revealed the details of the challenge: they hold invitations to the centennial anniversary of the L'Oreal brand, and their brief was to create an evening gown that a Philippine guest will wear to the centenary L'Oreal event in Paris, France. They were given pegs of L'Oreal advertisements from past to present as inspiration for their design, along with the instruction to use the colors gold, black, champagne, or white as the main color palette for their designs. 
Guest Judges:  
Winner:  Cherry Veric
Eliminated: Patrick Galang

Episode 11 – Channeling Cobonpue
Original Airdate: October 28, 2009

The final four designers face their last challenge to determine which three will compete in Philippine Fashion Week. Teresa met with the designers and informed them that they will be taking a trip and presented them with airline tickets, which revealed that the designers will be flying off to Cebu City along with mentor Jojie Lloren. Upon arrival in Cebu, the Project Runway Philippine contingent had a lunch at Aziza, an upscale fine dining restaurant, where the designers had a surprise guest: internationally renowned interior designer, Kenneth Cobonpue, whose critically acclaimed furniture pieces garnered worldwide press attention.

They were then taken to Z Bar, the upper level of Aziza, where the bar's interior was personally designed by Cobonpue in his signature style of using natural materials subjected in a modernistic approach. Afterwards, the designers were taken to the Kenneth Cobonpue showroom where they were able to see the world-famous furniture designs up close, including the Dragnet, Yoda, and Lolah chairs, as well as the Voyage bed, which was reported to be bought by Brad Pitt and Angelina Jolie. At the end of the tour, their final challenge was presented: to create an outfit of their choosing with Cobonpue furniture as their main inspiration. An additional brief was to incorporate Cobonpue's preferred materials to create his furnishings such as rattan and abaca as one of the main components in their garments. They were taken to Ayala Center Cebu to purchase fabric for their garments, after which they all flew back to Manila to complete their task.

Guest Judges: Kenneth Cobonpue and fashion designer, Ivarluski Aseron
Winner:  Russell Villafuerte
Eliminated: Cherry Veric

Episode 12 - The Reunion
Original Airdate: November 4, 2009

Episode 13 - Looking Back
Original Airdate: November 11, 2009

Episode 14 - The Final Runway (Part 1)
Original Airdate: November 25, 2009

Episode 15 - The Final Runway (Part 2)
Original Airdate: December 2, 2009
Guest Judges: Inno Sotto and Marco Muggianu
Winner:  Manny Marquez
2nd Place: Rusell Villafuerte
3rd Place: Santi Obcena

Elimination charts

Designer competition

:  Episode 2 is a team challenge. Cherry, Hanz, Jas, and Santi were selected as team leaders. Only Jas' team got the highest score while Santi's team and Cherry's team got the lowest scores eliminating Pau for having the worst design overall in the challenge.
:  In Episode 3 Jas have the worst design. Because Jas have immunity for winning the Episode 2 challenge, she was spared causing Tracy's elimination.
:  Episode 7 is a team challenge. Hanz, Meanne, Santi, and Russel were selected as team leaders. Since the challenge is about making a design collaboration, Hanz and Manny were both declared winners for this challenge. Patrick was brought back in the competition and was paired with Russell. Even though Cherry and Meanne's team have the worst design they were both spared for elimination.
:  Since there were no elimination in Episode 7, the two designers with the lowest scores were eliminated in Episode 8.

 Green background and WINNER means the designer won Project Runway Philippines.
 Blue background and WIN means the designer won that challenge.
 Blue background and HIGH means the designer's score was tied with the winning designer, but did not win the challenge.
 Turquoise background and HIGH means the designer had one of the highest scores for that challenge, and came in second.
 Light blue background and HIGH means the designer had one of the highest scores for that challenge, but did not place in the top two.
 Pink background and LOW means the designer had one of the lowest scores for that challenge, but was not eliminated.
 Orange background and LOW means the designer was in the bottom two, but was not eliminated.
 Violet background and LOW means the designer have the worst design but because of immunity the designer was spared for elimination.
 Red background and OUT means the designer lost and was out of the competition.

Fashion model competition 

 Green background and WINNER means the model was paired with the winning designer, and won the competition.
 Blue background and WIN means the model wore the winning design.
 Teal background and WIN means the model was paired with the winning designer, but did not participate in the runway show.
 Light blue background and IN means the model did not participate in the runway show.
 Pink background and IN means the model wore the losing design.
 Violet background and IN means the model was paired with the losing designer, but did not participate in the runway show.
 Red background and OUT means the model was eliminated.

External links
 Project Runway Philippines on ETC
 Patrick Galang's official website
 Santi Obcena's official website
 Tracy Dizon's official website
 Philippine Fashion Week official website

References

2009 Philippine television seasons
Season 02